The Crest Girls' Academy, formerly known as John Kelly Girls' Technology College, was a girls' secondary school with academy status located in Neasden, Brent, North West London. The school was situated next to Crest Boys' Academy; the schools shared a sixth form. All three schools were amalgamated into E-ACT Crest Academy, which opened in September 2014.

The Crest Girls' Academy was sponsored by E-ACT. The school was one of the first to gain a specialism in the specialist schools movement. Crest Girls had three specialisms: Technology (1998) Languages (2004) and Training Schools.

An Ofsted report in June 2013 judged the school as having serious weakness and offering an inadequate standard of education. The Academy underwent a restructure with new teaching and leadership appointments to drive forward standards. The Academy sought consultation over plans to merge Crest Girls' Academy and Crest Boys' Academy into one school, retaining single sex education. The Academy was due to merge in September 2014 and set to move into its new £40 million building also.

GCSE headline figures for the school had risen in recent years. In 2011 43% of students attending Crest Girls' Academy achieved 5 A*-C grades at GCSE including English and Maths. This rose to 51% 5A*-C grades at GCSE including English and Maths in 2012 and 56% in 2013.

Educational institutions established in 1958
Educational institutions disestablished in 2014
Girls' schools in London
1958 establishments in England
2014 disestablishments in England
Defunct schools in the London Borough of Brent